Salarpur may refer to:

Salarpur, Varanasi, a village in Varanasi district, India
Salarpur, Budaun, a Block & village panchayat in Budaun district
Salarpur Khadar, a town in Gautam Buddha Nagar district, Uttar Pradesh, India
 Salarpur, Sataon, a village in Raebareli district, Uttar Pradesh, India

Nearby
State Bank of India , DI Themes, ICICI Bank ATM